Chucuito Province is a province of the Puno Region in Peru. The capital of the province is the city of Juli.

History
Chucuito is cited by Comentarios Reales de los Incas. On the 1st chapter of the 3th book of Comentarios reales de los incas, Chucuito is mentioned because of huge monuments and anthropomorphic statues.

Geography 
Other mountains are listed below:

Languages
According to the 2007 census, Aymara was spoken by 72.4% of the population as their first language, while 26.8% spoke Spanish, 0.6% spoke Quechua, 0.1% spoke Asháninka, 0.0% spoke other indigenous languages and 0.0% spoke foreign languages.

Political division 
The province measures  and is divided into seven districts:

See also 
 Parinaquta
 Quraquta
 Q'axilu
 Tanqa Tanqa

References 

Provinces of the Puno Region